The 2020 Boost Mobile Super Trucks Series was the first season for the Boost Mobile Super Trucks, an Australian off-road racing series spawned as an offshoot of the American Stadium Super Trucks.

Due to the COVID-19 pandemic, much of the season's races were cancelled following the opening race at the Adelaide 500. Three of the eight rounds were to be combination races held alongside the Stadium Super Trucks. As a result, the series did not track standings for the season. Shae Davies was the lone Boost Mobile Super Truck driver to win a race.

Drivers

Schedule
During the 2019 Gold Coast 600 in October, the series' first race in Australia since Motorsport Australia lifted its year-long ban, the 2020 Australian schedule was announced under the Boost Mobile Super Trucks name. The full schedule was revealed on 21 November 2019, with the series being divided into the American Speed Energy Stadium Super Trucks and the Australian Boost Mobile Super Trucks; both championships intended to run three companion rounds.

Races cancelled due to the COVID-19 pandemic

Season summary
The Boost Mobile Super Trucks' inaugural race weekend came as an "Australia v USA Series" with the Speed Energy Stadium Super Trucks at the Adelaide Street Circuit. Excluding defending SST champion and Australian-American Matthew Brabham, eight drivers represented Australia at Adelaide. Among the Australian drivers were Supercars veteran Paul Weel in his return to racing for the first time since 2008, 2017 Stadium Super Trucks Series champion Paul Morris and his driving academy driver Luke van Herwaade under the Team Norwell banner, Super2 Series driver Shae Davies, Shaun Richardson in his first SST race since 2017, SST veterans Toby Price and Greg Gartner, and Matt Mingay racing for the first time since suffering serious injuries in a 2016 SST race. Robby Gordon won the season opener after holding off a last-lap charge by Price. The second race saw Mingay and Morris lead before Gordon and Brabham passed them in the second half, with Brabham edging out Gordon for the victory by .0361 seconds. In the third and final round, Gartner led early while Davies climbed through the field after avoiding wrecks. Davies eventually took the lead after the competition caution and pulled away while the field battled among themselves for position.

Prior to the onset of the COVID-19 pandemic, the Boost Mobile Super Trucks planned to run an eight-race schedule in conjunction with the Supercars Championship starting with the Adelaide 500 in late February. The trucks also planned to race in New Zealand for the first time at Hampton Downs Motorsport Park; the event was initially planned to take place at Pukekohe Park Raceway, but Pukekohe legislation forbade motorsports on Anzac Day (25 April).

Although the series had hoped to follow the Supercars Championship to postponed races once new races were finalised, the trucks ultimately did not join the Supercars at their revised dates.

Results and standings

Race results

Drivers' championship
Points are approximate based on the SST points system and unofficial as the series did not track standings for the 2020 season.

See also
 Impact of the COVID-19 pandemic on motorsport

Notes

References

Boost
Boost
Boost